Ivana Marie Trump may refer to:

Ivana Trump (Ivana Marie Zelníčková) (1949–2022), Czech-American businesswoman and first wife of Donald Trump
Ivanka Trump (born 1981), American businesswoman and daughter of Donald and Ivana Trump